was the fifth Itakura daimyō of Bitchū-Matsuyama Domain.  Katsuaki was the fourth son of Itakura Katsumasa. His mother was the daughter of Toda Ujihide, daimyō of Ōgaki Domain. His childhood name was Shinjuro (新十郎).

Family
 Father: Itakura Katsumasa
 Mother: daughter of Toda Ujihide
 Wife: Omura Sumiyasu's daughter
 Son: Itakura Katsutsune

Title

1784 births
1804 deaths
Itakura clan
Fudai daimyo